The European Grasstrack Championship is a motorcycle championship and is organised by FIM Europe. The first championship took place in 1978 at Hereford Racecourse, England and was won by Chris Baybutt. The competitors qualified though two semi-finals.  Don Godden of England won the first semi-final in Artigues de Lussac, France and Skjold Larsen of Denmark won the second in Stadskanaal, Netherlands.

Medalists

Results by Rider

Results by country

European Sidecar Championship
The European Grasstrack Sidecar Championship started in 1978.

References

 http://www.fim-europe.com/
 http://grasstrackgb.co.uk/european-solo-championship-2/

Speedway competitions
European championships

Recurring sporting events established in 1978
1978 establishments in Europe
1978 in motorsport